World Trigger is a Japanese anime series based on the manga series of the same name written and illustrated by Daisuke Ashihara. In May 2014, the series adaptation was announced to start airing in October of the same year. The series was produced by Toei Animation and broadcast on TV Asahi from October 5, 2014 to April 3, 2016. The series is directed by Mitsuru Hongo with series composition by Hiroyuki Yoshino. Toshihisa Kaiya and Hitomi Tsuruta are the character designers and animation directors, and the music is composed by Kenji Kawai. The series was originally slated to run for 50 episodes, but ended up having 73 episodes.

In summer 2015, the World Trigger Summer Festival 2015 event announced World Trigger: Isekai Kara no Tōbōsha, a brand new series with an original story not presented in the World Trigger manga, and with new characters and concepts. This "new series" actually ended up being the "Fugitive Arc" of the anime, which ran from Episodes 49 to 63. On March 7, 2016, it was confirmed that the World Trigger anime would end, after it was announced that TV Asahi would be replacing the time slot airing it with sports programming.

In North America, Toei announced in July 2015 that they would be producing an English dub with Ocean Productions. The series began airing in the United States on Primo TV on January 16, 2017. The English dub became available on Crunchyroll on February 11, 2020.

During Jump Festa '20, it was announced that the series will receive a second season, with the cast reprising their roles. Toei Animation is returning to produce the anime. Morio Hatano is the new series director, while the rest of the staff are reprising their roles. The second season aired on TV Asahi's NUMAnimation block from January 10 to April 4, 2021. On October 8, 2021, it was announced the English dub of season 2 will be released in 2022.

During Jump Festa 2021, it was announced that the series will receive a third season, with the second season airing for one cour (season) in Fall 2021. The third season aired from October 10, 2021 to January 23, 2022. On December 23, 2021, two additional episodes were announced for January 2022.

Series overview

Episode list

Season 1 (2014–16)

Season 2 (2021)

Season 3 (2021–22)

Notes

References

World Trigger
World Trigger